Region XII (Spanish: Región XII. Tlalnepantla) is an intrastate region within the State of Mexico.

Geography
It is one of the 10 regions that comprise the Mexico City Metropolitan Area. It borders Mexico City to the north, and is part of the Greater Mexico City.

The region comprises two cities, both densely populated cities having very low margination, Tlalnepantla de Baz and Atizapan de Zaragoza.

Municipalities

References

Regions of the State of Mexico
Mexico City metropolitan area